For the Canadian lumber merchant and politician, see Evan John Price.

Evan David Lewis Price is a barrister at Ten Old Square, Lincoln's Inn in London and Conservative politician and is second on the Welsh Conservatives' list of candidates for the next European Parliamentary elections in 2009.

Background
Born and raised in Wales, Price attended Sandhurst and joined the Royal Regiment of Wales, serving in Germany, Hong Kong and Northern Ireland as well as England and Wales.  After 7 years in the army, he left in 1993 and went to university.  He qualified as a barrister and was called to the bar in 1997, specialising in property, insolvency and commercial litigation, and also advises on constitutional and administrative matters.

Political career
Price's grandfather was the first minister of state for Welsh affairs, who was also appointed a member of the European Assembly (the forerunner to the Parliament).

Price has campaigned in elections all over the country; recently in Brecon & Radnor and Blaenau Gwent as well as Sedgefield and London. He has advised the Conservative party on a number of issues; as part of a committee of lawyers about constitutional reforms and as an individual about the effects and possible effects of policy ideas on the law and the law on policy ideas.

On 28 March 2008 it was announced that he is placed second on the Welsh Conservatives' list of candidates for the next European Parliamentary elections in 2009.  This has caused some controversy as Price has used an address in London for his nomination papers; he has used this address as this is the location of his principal residence, but has emphasised that he is also registered to vote in Wales.

References

External links
Evan D. L. Price Website
Evan's Thoughts, political and legal blog of Evan D. L. Price 
Welsh Conservatives Website
Q&A Session for ConservativeHome

Year of birth missing (living people)
Living people
Welsh politicians
Conservative Party (UK) politicians
Welsh barristers
Members of the Middle Temple
Royal Regiment of Wales officers